The Central American and Caribbean Games is a quadrennial event which began in
1926.  The
Games records in athletics are set
by athletes who are representing one of the ODECABE's member federations.  
Both the initial records and the records broken in 2010 can be found on the official Games webpage.

Records for defunct events were assembled from the gbrathletics website.   Wind info, relay teams and results for combined events for early competitions can be found on the CACAC webpage.

Men's records

Women's records

Records in defunct events

Men's events

Women's events

See also
List of Central American and Caribbean records in athletics

References

External links

Records
Central American and Caribbean
Caribbean-related lists
Central America-related lists
Athletics